This is a list of KBO League seasons, providing the final ranking of teams in the KBO League at the end of each season, based on the final regular-season standings plus postseason play including the Korea Series. Sections below are divided based on the number of teams in the league and the season format:

 No. of Teams
 1982–1985: 6 teams
 1986–1990: 7 teams
 1991–2012: 8 teams
 2013–2014: 9 teams
 2015–present: 10 teams

 Season format
From 1982 to 1988, the regular season was divided into two — a spring season and a fall season — with a first-half pennant winner and a latter-half pennant winner. In 1999–2000, the KBO had two divisions of four teams each — the Dream League and the Magic League. From 1989 to 1998, and from 2001 onward, the KBO featured a single division.

1982–1985: 6 teams, 2 half-seasons 
The league began play in 1982 with six teams. There were no changes to the league through 1985, except for the Sammi Superstars being renamed as the Chungbo Pintos that season.

1986–1988: 7 teams, 2 half-seasons 
The league expanded to seven teams in 1986 with the addition of the Binggrae Eagles. In 1988, the Chungbo Pintos were renamed the Pacific Dolphins.

1989–1990: 7 teams 
The league discontinued half-season schedules for the 1989 season, while maintaining the same teams. In 1990, MBC Chungyong was renamed LG Twins.

1991–1998: 8 teams 
The league expanded to eight teams with the addition of the Ssangbangwool Raiders in 1991. In 1994, the Binggrae Eagles were renamed the Hanwha Eagles, and in 1996, the Pacific Dolphins were renamed the Hyundai Unicorns.

1999–2000: 8 teams, 2 divisions 
In 1999, the OB Bears were renamed the Doosan Bears. The Ssangbangwool Raiders dissolved after the 1999 season, and were replaced in 2000 by SK Wyverns. During these two seasons, the league operated with two divisions of four teams each.

2001–2012: 8 teams 
The league discontinued use of divisions in 2001. The Hyundai Unicorns dissolved after the 2007 season, and were replaced in 2008 by the Woori Heroes. Due to issues with sponsorship, the team was known simply as "Heroes" for part of that season and all of the 2009 season, then became the Nexen Heroes in 2010.

2013–2014: 9 teams 
The league expanded to nine teams in 2013 with the addition of NC Dinos.

2015–present: 10 teams 
The league expanded to 10 teams in 2015 with the addition of KT Wiz. In 2019, the Nexen Heroes we renamed as the Kiwoom Heroes, and in 2021, SK Wyverns were renamed as SSG Landers.